The Australian cricket team toured New Zealand in January and February 2017 to play three One Day Internationals (ODIs).

Australia's captain Steve Smith was ruled out of series after suffering an ankle injury in the final ODI against Pakistan. Matthew Wade was named as Australia's captain in Smith's place and Sam Heazlett was added to the squad as Smith's replacement. However, Wade was ruled out of the first match with a back complaint and Aaron Finch took over as captain. Before the second ODI, Wade was ruled out of series due to back injury and Finch continued to captain in the remaining matches.

New Zealand won the series 2–0, to reclaim the Chappell-Hadlee Trophy.

Squads

Martin Guptill was ruled out of the second ODI due to a hamstring problem. Dean Brownlie was added into the squad as his cover. Ish Sodhi was added into the squad and Tom Blundell was released from the squad for final ODI. Guptill had not recovered from hamstring injury and was ruled out of the third ODI.

ODI series

1st ODI

2nd ODI

3rd ODI

References

External links
 Series home at ESPN Cricinfo

2017 in Australian cricket
2017 in New Zealand cricket
International cricket competitions in 2016–17
Australian cricket tours of New Zealand